Hockey Club Sochi is a professional ice hockey team based in Sochi, Russia. The team joined the Kontinental Hockey League (KHL) in 2014–15 season.

History

On May 23, 2014, it was reported that Detroit Red Wings' pending restricted free agent centre Cory Emmerton had signed with HC Sochi to begin play in the Kontinental Hockey League with the 2014–15 season, becoming the first import player signed in franchise history.

In the club's inaugural season, Sochi were able to qualify for the play-off to compete for the Gagarin Cup, finishing in 13th place overall of the KHL. In its debut playoff series, Sochi were swept in the first round by HC CSKA Moscow in four games. In the following 2015–16 season, Sochi climbed to 4th place in the Western Conference, but again dropped out in the first round of play-off, suffering another sweep at the hands of HC Dynamo Moscow.

Evgeny Stavrovsky became the new head coach on October 15 of the 2020–21 season. In preparation for the 2020–21 season, having competed in the Tarasov Division, Sochi was moved to the Bobrov Division to alleviate any potential issues with teams transiting during the COVID-19 pandemic.

Season-by-season record
Note: GP = Games played, W = Wins, L = Losses, OTL = Overtime/shootout losses, Pts = Points, GF = Goals for, GA = Goals against

Players

Current roster

Franchise records and leaders

KHL scoring leaders 

These are the top-ten point-scorers in franchise history. Figures are updated after each completed KHL regular season.

Note: Pos = Position; GP = Games played; G = Goals; A = Assists; Pts = Points; P/G = Points per game;  = current Sochi player

References

External links

  

 
Sochi
Ice hockey clubs established in 2014
Sochi
Sochi
2014 establishments in Russia